"Big Purr (Prrdd)" (stylized as "BIG PURR (Prrdd)") is a song by American rappers Coi Leray and Pooh Shiesty, released on March 26, 2021 by Republic Records, and serves as the second single from the former's debut album Trendsetter (2022). The song was produced by Kid Hazel and Peter Gundry. On April 26, 2021, Leray confirmed that there would be a remix of the song featuring hip hop duo City Girls.

Background
Coi Leray first previewed "Big Purr" on February 19, 2021, in a TikTok video of her dancing and singing along to it. She later teased the song with a video on YouTube, before releasing it on March 26.

Controversy
In March 2021, rapper Rolling Ray accused Coi Leray of stealing his phrase "purr" and turning it into a song. After they argued over who made the word "purr" popular, Leray denied the accusations responding, "First of all, I'm not big 'purr.' It's not 'purr.' I'm big 'prrr.' It's a difference. Stop playin' with me." Rolling Ray later released his own version of "Big Purr" as a diss track towards Leray, to which she threatened legal action. Ray also joined Leray's father Benzino, a rapper who is feuding with Leray, on Instagram Live to taunt her. Rolling Ray expressed in an Instagram Live stream that "he was sick of gay artists having their ideas stolen, and he wanted to prevent the same situation from happening to 'Purr'".

Music video
The music video was released on April 30, 2021, and directed by Reel Goats. It features Coi Leray wearing a leather ensemble while fighting Pooh Shiesty's crew in a warehouse. Shiesty counts his money and strokes his diamond until Leray faces him. The video then ends with a cliffhanger.

Charts

Certifications

Release history

References

2021 singles
2021 songs
Coi Leray songs
Pooh Shiesty songs
Republic Records singles
Songs written by Coi Leray
Songs written by Pooh Shiesty